Mysteryland is the leading electronic dance music festival in the Netherlands, organized by the Netherlands-based promoter ID&T. Being the first of its kind in the country when it was established, its organizers have billed the event as the oldest dance music festival in the Netherlands. It has most recently been held at Haarlemmermeerse Bos in Haarlemmermeer; an exhibition ground that hosted the 2002 edition of the Dutch gardening festival Floriade.
It is traditionally held on the final weekend of August; the next date is August 25-27, 2023. Since 2015, the festival has changed from a one-day to a three-day event with camping. Each year, more than 100.000 visitors from over 100 nationalities are welcomed at Mysteryland.

In 2011, an international edition of Mysteryland was held in Chile, the first to be held outside the Netherlands.

Mysteryland USA, the American version of Mysteryland, was first held on Memorial Day weekend, May 2014, at the Bethel Woods Center for the Arts, the site of the notable Woodstock festival held in 1969. Headliners included Kaskade, Moby, Steve Aoki, Dillon Francis, and Flosstradamus. Mysteryland USA 2017 was canceled.

Previous editions

See also

List of electronic music festivals

References

External links
Official site

Dance festivals in the Netherlands
Electronic music festivals in Chile
Electronic music festivals in the Netherlands
Electronic music festivals in the United States
1993 establishments in the Netherlands
Music festivals established in 1993